Maria Alexandrovna Spiridonova (16 October 1884 – 11 September 1941) was a Narodnik-inspired Russian revolutionary. In 1906, as a novice member of a local combat group of the Tambov  Socialists-Revolutionaries (SRs), she assassinated a security official. Her subsequent abuse by police earned her enormous popularity with the opponents of Tsarism throughout the empire and even abroad.

After spending over 11 years in Siberian prisons she was freed after the February Revolution of 1917, and returned to European Russia as a heroine of the destitute, and especially of the peasants. She was the only woman other than Alexandra Kollontai to play a prominent role during the Russian Revolution, leading the Left Socialist-Revolutionaries to initially side with Lenin and the Bolsheviks, and then to break with them.

From 1918 on, she was repeatedly arrested, imprisoned, briefly detained in a mental sanitarium, sent into internal exile, and finally shot in 1941. A successful campaign was run to discredit her name and portray her as a hysterical extremist, and she was "forced into oblivion". In 1958, when publishing the fourth volume of A History of Socialist Thought, G.D.H. Cole wrote that nothing was known of what had happened to her after 1920. Twenty years later, Richard Stites was still uncertain whether her death occurred in 1937 or 1941. Only after the end of Stalinism and the fall of the Soviet Union did it gradually become possible to reconstruct the last decades of her life.

Biography

Early life 
Her father, a bank official, was a member of the non-hereditary minor nobility of the Russian Empire. She attended the local gymnasium until 1902, when the death of her father, and a case of tuberculosis, caused her to drop out. She studied dentistry in Moscow for a short while, before returning to Tambov to work as a clerk for the local Assembly of the Nobility. She soon became involved in political activism and was arrested during the student demonstrations of March 1905. In September 1905 she applied for training as a feldsher (a health care professional similar to a physician assistant) but was rejected due to her political record. Instead, she joined the Party of Socialists–Revolutionaries (SRs) and became a full-time activist. During this time, she formed a relationship with Vladimir Vol'skii, a local SR leader.

Like most SRs, she shared the Narodniks' philosophy of assassination and terrorism as a weapon of revolution, and was one of hundreds of SRs who, in the years around the 1905 Revolution, attacked the Russian state and its leaders.

Luzhenovsky assassination

Luzhenovsky, also a local leader of the Union of the Russian People (the most important branch of the Black Hundred), was known for his harsh suppression of peasant unrest in the district, and the SR committee in Tambov had "passed a death sentence on him". Spiridonova volunteered to kill him. She stalked Luzhenovsky for several days, and finally got her chance at the Borisoglebsk railway station on 16 January 1906. Disguised as a secondary school student, she fired several shots from a revolver and hit Luzhenovsky five times. He died on 10 February 1906.

Unable to escape, Spiridonova tried to turn her weapon against herself but was restrained, brutally beaten and arrested by Luzhenovsky's Cossack guard. She was then transferred to the local police station where she was stripped naked, searched and mocked by her captors. She was interrogated and tortured for more than half a day by two government officials, P.F. Avramov, head of the Cossack guard, and T.S. Zhdanov, a local police officer. That night she was transported to Tambov by train. During the journey, Avramov subjected her to further ill-treatment and sexual harassment, possibly rape.

The Luzhenovsky assassination was one of close to two hundred acts of SR "individual terror" during the 1905 Revolution and the two following years' turmoil. It received mainly local attention until the following month, when Spiridonova succeeded in leaking a very well-thought-out letter to the press. It described the treatment she had received, including threats of gang rape directed at her, and hinted that Avramov might have raped her on the train to Tambov. The letter was published on 12 February 1906  by Rus, a liberal newspaper in Saint Petersburg, and soon taken up by others, becoming an immediate sensation with their readers.

Progressive public opinion in Russia traditionally tended to consider terrorism with a certain degree of understanding, as it was regarded as a natural reaction against autocracy. For example, in 1878 a jury caused a sensation by acquitting populist terrorist Vera Zasulich despite her pleading guilty to causing serious injury to Colonel Fyodor Trepov during a failed attempt to assassinate him. In the case of Spiridonova, many were outraged by the appalling cruelty to a prisoner, especially as she was an attractive young woman. Liberal circles throughout Russia condemned the Tambov authorities. Spiridonova was described as "a pure, virginal being, a flower of spiritual beauty [...] [being put] into the shaggy paws of brutally repulsive, brutally malicious, brutally salacious orangutans".

Rus sent reporter Vsevolod A. Vladimirov to Tambov. He produced seven sensational articles that appeared in March 1906. These articles exaggerated Spiridonova's mistreatment and injuries, and more explicitly touched on her alleged rape. Vladimirov also glossed over Spiridonova's political convictions, portraying her as a genteel, high-principled victim of the tyrannical Russian system. This annoyed the Tambov SRs almost as much as it did the conservatives and the authorities. Spiridonova herself repudiated Vladimirov's account.

On 11 March, Spiridonova was tried and convicted of Luzhenovsky's murder and sentenced to death. However, the tribunal also asked that the sentence be commuted to penal servitude in Siberia, in view of her ill health. This was approved on 20 March. The liberal press continued its campaign in her support. On 2 April Avramov was himself assassinated, creating a further sensation.

The government released its report on the case on 8 April. The report acknowledged that Spiridonova had been beaten by the Cossacks at the time of her arrest and that Avramov had verbally abused her on the train, but denied all the more lurid accusations. This was denounced by some as a whitewash.

Secret letters from Spiridonova in prison to her sister Yulia, a fellow SR, had been seized by police on 19 February and were summarized by the Tambov deputy prosecutor in a report to the national authorities. His extracts indicate that Spiridonova consciously participated in the image-making that was going on outside, suggesting what should be emphasized and what should be played down. A request in one letter not to reveal her "romantic history", presumably her relationship with Volsky, was quoted. Many liberals called this an attempt to slander her morals. The governor of Tambov had known about the affair (Spiridonova appealed for a meeting with Volsky, whom she described as her fiancé although he was already married), but did not pass on the information, which would have demolished Spiridonova's "virginal" image.

Spiridonova was sent to Siberia in the company of five other prominent female SR terrorists. The group was sometimes called the Shesterka ("Six"). As a result of the press campaign, Spiridonova was the most famous.  She was also young, attractive, and an ethnic Russian (at least four of the others were Jewish, Belarusian, and Ukrainian). The Shesterka were transported by train from Moscow to the Nerchinsk katorga, a system of penal labor colonies in Transbaikal (east of Lake Baikal and near the border of China). Their slow journey lasted around a month and turned into a kind of triumphal progress: the train was met at every stop by growing crowds of sympathizers. Each time, although she was suffering from a serious recurrence of tuberculosis, Spiridonova would get up from her couch, greet the audience with smiles and patiently answer their numerous questions, expounding the SR political program. , one of the Shesterka, later commented:

Spiridonova and her comrades were first detained in the Akatuy penal colony. The prison regime of the colony was exceedingly mild, more similar to a sort of internal exile or political confinement than to a real prison. In 1907, however, they were removed to the new female colony that had been established at Maltsev, another centre of the Nerchinsk katorga. Here the rules of detention were somewhat stricter, albeit surely not so extreme as in 'the regimes of punishment and mistreatment that "politicals" endured elsewhere' (including beatings, floggings and isolation in dark, freezing cells). 'For the Maltsev women there was no forced labor, only enforced isolation from the outside world in which each day was like the next and the one that had gone before'.

In 1908 a young Ukrainian maximalist, Irina Konstantinovna Kakhovskaya arrived at Maltsev. She had been convicted of involvement in a terrorist group. Kakhovskaya was a descendant of Decembrist revolutionary Pyotr Grigoryevich Kakhovsky, who had been hanged in 1826 for assassinating Saint-Petersburg Governor Mikhail Andreyevich Miloradovich, and another Grenadier officer. She formed a special friendship with Spiridonova and Izmailovich, a bond of political and personal sisterhood that would last throughout their lives.

In April 1911, 28 female inmates, including Spiridonova, were transferred back to Akatuy where the conditions of their detention were further worsened, and they were forced to work in a bookbindery. The constant physical work, however, was eventually welcomed by the detainees and made their prison life more tolerable.

Left SR leader

Accommodation with the revolution

After the February Revolution of 1917, Spiridinova was released from incarceration at the women's Akatuy prison by a general amnesty covering imprisoned political criminals. According to Alexander Rabinowitch, Spiridonova was widely esteemed by the common people of Russia, being venerated by many peasants as very nearly a saint.

Spiridonova traveled from Siberia to Moscow to attend the 3rd National Congress of the Party of Socialists-Revolutionaries (the SRs) late in May 1917, but she was not elected to the governing Central Committee of the party. Despite this failure, Spiridonova became deeply involved in party affairs as a leader of the SR left-wing and of the party's organization in the capital city of Petrograd. She was also involved in work helping to establish soviets amongst the peasantry.

Following the October Revolution, Spiridonova cast in her lot with the Left SRs, who had split from their old party and sided with their erstwhile rivals of the Bolshevik Party. She was extremely supportive of efforts to forge a unity government between the Bolsheviks, the Left SRs, and the other socialist parties represented in the Soviets, but when it proved impossible to reach a general agreement she supported the Left SRs entering into a coalition government with only the Bolsheviks. Her name was included by the railroad union (Vikzhel) in a list of possible candidate ministers for the unity government, but she did not take a ministerial role in the new Bolshevik-Left SR government. Instead, she was appointed head of the Peasant Section of the Central Executive Committee of the All-Russian Soviet of Workers', Peasants', and Soldiers' Deputies (VTsIK), making her nominally a chief official over peasant affairs. She was later one of a handful of Left SR leaders offering early support for Lenin's decision to agree to the draconian peace terms offered by the government of Imperial Germany in the Treaty of Brest-Litovsk. As the head of the Peasant Section of the VTsIK, Spiridonova appeared almost exclusively focused on winning the approval of the soviets and enforcement of an SR-inspired law of land socialization, constituting agrarian reform. The law was eventually passed on 19 February 1918. Consequently, for some months she strived primarily to safeguard the alliance with the Bolsheviks, even at the cost of being temporarily sidelined within her own party.

On 18 January 1918, at the inaugural meeting of the Constituent Assembly both the Left SRs and the Bolsheviks proposed Spiridonova as their candidate for the chair, but centrist SR Víktor Mikhailovich Chernov was elected instead. The Assembly was dissolved for good after the end of that same first session.

Revolt against Bolshevism

The honeymoon between Spiridonova (and the Left SRs generally) and the Bolsheviks was short-lived. Late in the spring of 1918 Bolshevik military detachments were formed to conduct forced requisitions of grain in a desperate effort to stave off famine in the cities amidst economic collapse. "The brutal Bolshevik grain-procurement policy and the devastating impact on the peasantry of the Soviet government's vast territorial and increasingly onerous economic concessions to Imperial Germany" caused widespread discontent in the countryside and the Peasant Section of the VTsIK was overwhelmed with complaints and protests. As head of the Section, Spiridonova was especially aware of the deepening misery of peasants throughout the country. Unity between Left SRs and Bolsheviks turned to rivalry over the future of the revolution and a competition ensued for control of the 5th Congress of Soviets, scheduled to begin in Moscow on 4 July 1918.

Historian Alexander Rabinowitch summarized the prelude to what he would later term "the suicide of the Left SRs" in his work on the first year of Soviet rule in Petrograd:

Spiridonova immediately assumed the "political" responsibility for the attack on behalf of the party's Central Committee. In her 1937 letter to the NKVD (see below), she claimed also to have directed the attack (even showing a sort of 'professional' pride).

The confrontation with the government, however, did not evolve as the Left SR leadership had expected. At the time of Mirbach's assassination the Left SRs enjoyed undoubted military superiority in the Moscow area and within the Cheka, but they "showed no inclination to press home" this advantage: they appeared "much less interested in seizing power themselves than they were in calling for a popular uprising to force the Bolsheviks to change their policies. The Left SRs had no idea where this uprising would end up: they were happy to leave that to the 'revolutionary creativity of the masses'." For his part, Lenin, far from fueling a new conflagration with Germany, used Mirbach's assassination as a pretext for the suppression of the Left SR organization, the terrorist attack being immediately portrayed as a straightforward uprising against Soviet power. Lenin promptly summoned Jukums Vācietis, the commander of the Latvian Riflemen, now headquartered in the outskirts of the capital, and secured their support; albeit not immediately available, they were the only military forces capable of effectively opposing the units controlled by the Left Social Revolutionaries. While the latter continued 'to rise up' without even moving from their barracks, Spiridonova and her comrades hastened to the Bolshoi Theatre, where she delivered an inflamed speech against the Bolshevik regime before the ongoing Congress of Soviets, which they evidently regarded as the supreme authority in the Soviet republic. In the meantime, the theatre security forces proceeded to seal the building and detain all the Left SR delegates therein. Later the Bolsheviks recaptured the Cheka headquarters at the Lubyanka and overcame the Cheka Combat Detachment commanded by Left SR Dmitry Popov, the unit that had taken over the Pokrovsky barracks and arrested Felix Dzerzhinsky when he had gone there to arrest Mirbach's assassins. Thus ended the Left SR uprising, and historian Orlando Figes notes that "it was not a coup d'état but —not unlike the Bolsheviks' own July uprising of 1917— a suicidal act of public protest to galvanize 'the masses' against the regime. At no point did the Left SRs ever really think of taking power. They were only 'playing at revolution'."

Spiridonova and many other Left SR leaders were imprisoned in Moscow, her Peasant Section of the VTsIK was dissolved, and an undisclosed number of other party members (over 200 according to Spiridonova herself) were summarily shot.

After she was kept in jail for several months, it was announced that Spiridonova was to be tried on 1 December 1918. To undercut the possibility of a potentially volatile situation developing a secret trial was conducted on 27 November instead. Spiridonova was sentenced to one year in prison for her part in the Left SR revolt but was amnestied the next day.

Further imprisonment

Spiridonova became the voice of a radical faction of the Left SRs opposed to any accommodation with the "Communist" regime (as the Bolsheviks now styled themselves) and she publicly denounced the government for having betrayed the revolution with its policies and actions. Despite her bitter refusal to compromise, Spiridonova remained separate from the party's ultra-left terrorist wing, focusing on the idea of revitalizing the system of Soviets in opposition to the rule of the Communist party by bureaucratic edict.

In January 1919, after another public speech in opposition to the Communist government, Spiridonova was arrested by the Moscow Cheka. She was tried once more on 24 February 1919, with ex Left Communist leader Nikolai Bukharin as the sole witness for the prosecution. Bukharin charged that Spiridonova was mentally ill and a menace to society in the deadly political atmosphere of the Russian Civil War. Spiridonova was found guilty and sentenced to one year's incarceration in a mental sanitarium, effectively removing her from politics.

Instead of a sanitarium, Spiridonova was actually confined in a small holding cell inside a military barracks in the Kremlin, where her already frail health rapidly deteriorated. Left SR militants organized her escape on 2 April 1919. Spiridonova subsequently lived underground in Moscow as a peasant woman under the pseudonym Onufrieva. She was rearrested 19 months later, ill with typhus and suffering from an unstated nervous disorder: it was 'the night of October 26, 1920, exactly three years after the victory of the October Revolution'.  This time, the Communist authorities proved somewhat more merciful than usual: given her extremely poor health, Spiridonova was initially put under house arrest. Alexandra Izmailovich was transferred from Butyrka prison and charged with nursing her, along with the party co-leader, Boris Kamkov, then possibly Spiridonova's romantic partner as well. Kamkov was with her at the moment of arrest and was permitted to stay beside her for the next four months. She was later transferred to a Cheka medical facility, then confined in a psychiatric prison.

She was finally released to the custody of two Left SR comrades on 18 November 1921 under the condition that she cease and desist all political activity. Historian Alexander Rabinowitch comments that there is no evidence that she ever violated this condition. Spiridonova's active political life was at an end.

Persecution, death and legacy 

Despite her withdrawal from active politics, she was arrested again on 16 May 1923. At the time large numbers of moderate socialist and liberal leaders were permitted or obliged to emigrate to the West (including the two Left Socialist-Revolutionaries to whom Spiridonova had been entrusted). Nevertheless, Spiridonova was charged with "having made preparations to flee abroad" and sentenced to three years of administrative exile, a sentence that was repeatedly extended. She spent the rest of the 1920s in Kaluga (1923–25), Samarkand (1925–28) and Tashkent (1928–30). In 1930, after Stalin's consolidation of power, Spiridonova was arrested once again. Charged with maintaining contacts abroad, she was sentenced to three more years of administrative exile (twice extended), this time in Ufa, capital of the Bashkir Republic. She lived with her former prison partner Izmailovich during the whole period of exile. Kakhovskaya also spent time with them as often and as long as she was permitted to. In the mid-1920s Spiridonova had also married her fellow exile , a Left SR leader of peasant origin and erstwhile Deputy People's Commissar for Agriculture.

In 1937 Spiridonova was arrested yet again, with several former party comrades including her husband, her teenaged stepson, her invalid father-in-law, Alexandra Izmailovich, Irina Kakhovskaya and the latter's aged aunt. The group was accused of plotting to create a united counter-revolutionary center and to assassinate Bashkir Communist leaders. Spiridonova underwent cruel interrogation in prison in Ufa and in Moscow for several months, without admitting any guilt, although a confession was extorted from her husband. In November 1937 she wrote a long letter to the 4th Section of the Main Directorate of State Security (GUGB) within the People's Commissariat for Internal Affairs (NKVD) from her cell, protesting against the prison treatment inflicted on her, contesting the correctness of the judicial procedure and rejecting every single charge. The letter proclaimed that she fully supported the construction of socialism and acknowledged the Communist leadership. However, she concluded what was later called her 'last testament' with a vibrant heart-felt plea against capital punishment, twice abolished in the aftermaths of the February and October Revolutions and twice re-established by subsequent governments despite vehement protests from the Left Social-Revolutionaries:

On 7 January 1938, she was eventually sentenced to 25 years in prison by the Military Collegium of the Supreme Court. After a hunger strike, she was held in isolation at Oryol Prison. On 11 September 1941 (three months after the German invasion of the USSR), Spiridonova, Izmailovich, Mayorov and over 150 other political prisoners (among them Christian Rakovsky and Olga Kameneva), were executed by order of Stalin in the Medvedevsky Forest massacre.

Despite Kakhovskaya's efforts after the 1956 20th Congress of the Communist Party of the Soviet Union, "not until 1990 were the 1941 charges against Spiridonova rescinded [...] Finally, in 1992, [she] was exonerated of the charges for which she had been imprisoned and exiled beginning in 1918, and was fully rehabilitated." The exact burial place of the Medvedevsky Forest victims has never been found.

Spiridonova in Russian culture 
Some of Russia's major poets, such as Maksimilian Voloshin, dedicated their poems to Spiridonova during the First Revolution. Russian historian Yaroslav Leontiev believes that Boris Pasternak also immortalized Spiridonova (but already without being able to name her directly), in the first few lines of his poem 'The Year 1905', published in 1926.

Notes

References

 Sally A. Boniece, Maria Spiridonova, 1884-1918: Feminine Martyrdom and Revolutionary Mythmaking. PhD dissertation. Indiana University, 1995.
 Sally A. Boniece, "The Spiridonova Case, 1906: Terror, Myth and Martyrdom," in Anthony Anemone (ed.), Just Assassins: The Culture of Terrorism in Russia. Evanston: Northwestern University Press, 2010, pp. 127–151. 
 Sally A. Boniece, The Shesterka of 1905-06: Terrorist Heroines of Revolutionary Russia; «Jahrbücher für Geschichte Osteuropas», New Series, Vol. 58, 2, 2010, pp. 172–191
 George Douglas Howard Cole, A History of Socialist Thought, volume IV: Communism and Social Democracy 1914-1931, London-New York: Macmillan-St. Martin's Press, 1958, parts I and II
 
 Anna Geifman, Thou shalt kill: revolutionary terrorism in Russia, 1894-1917, Princeton, Princeton University Press, 1993, 
 Margaret Maxwell, Narodniki women: Russian women who sacrificed themselves for the dream of freedom, Oxford: Pergamon Press, 1990. 
 Jane McDermid, Mariya Spiridonova: Russian Martyr and British Heroine? The Portrayal of a Russian Female Terrorist in the Britich Press, in Ian D. Thatcher (ed), Reinterpreting Revolutionary Russia: Essays in Honour of James D. White, Basingstoke, Palgrave Macmillan, 2006, pp. 36–54, 
 Alexander Rabinowitch. "Maria Spiridonova's 'Last Testament'", Russian Review, Vol. 54, No. 3 (July 1995), pp. 424–446
 Alexander Rabinowitch, The Bolsheviks in power: the first year of Soviet rule in Petrograd, Bloomington: Indiana University Press, 2007. 
 Alexander Rabinowitch, "Spiridonova," in Edward Acton, Vladimir Iu. Cherniaev, and William G. Rosenberg (eds.), Critical Companion to the Russian Revolution, 1914-1921. Bloomington, IN: Indiana University Press, 1997. 
 Isaac Nachman Steinberg, Spiridonova: Revolutionary Terrorist. London: Methuen, 1935

External links 

 Maria Spiridonova at Spartacus Educational
 Emma Goldman, My Disillusionment in Russia: Chapter 16: Maria Spiridonova, www.marxists.org/
 Short biography at History Today.
 "Spiridonova - Armed Love" (2017; 51 min), screened as part of the London Anarchist Bookfare 2017 program: https://www.youtube.com/watch?v=cv6Kn1ixAv0.

1884 births
1941 deaths
People from Tambov
People from Tambovsky Uyezd
Left socialist-revolutionaries
Russian Constituent Assembly members
Revolutionaries from the Russian Empire
20th-century Russian women politicians
Female revolutionaries
Assassins from the Russian Empire
Great Purge victims from Russia
Deaths by firearm in Russia